Seraphic Fire is a professional vocal ensemble in the United States, led by Artistic Director Patrick Dupré Quigley and Executive Director Rhett M. Del Campo, and based in Miami. Seraphic Fire's repertoire includes Gregorian chants, Baroque masterpieces, works by Mahler, and newly commissioned works by American composers.

Two of the ensemble's recordings, Brahms: Ein Deutsches Requiem and A Seraphic Fire Christmas were nominated for the 2012 Grammy awards, making Seraphic Fire the only choral ensemble in North or South America to be nominated that year, and the only classical ensemble in the world to be nominated for two separate projects.

The ensemble's September 2014 release, Reincarnations: A Century of American Choral Music, placed No. 6 on the Billboard Traditional Classical Chart and the ensemble's Grammy-nominated recording of Brahms: Ein Deutsches Requiem debuted at No. 7 on the Billboard Traditional Classical Chart.

Seraphic Fire has a partnership with Naxos of America for the distribution of its media. The group maintains a regular schedule of concerts throughout South Florida and also tours nationally.

Education Activities 
In 2018, Seraphic Fire launched the Professional Choral Institute in partnership with the Aspen Music Festival and School to prepare singers specifically for professional ensemble singing.

Seraphic Fire also maintains partnerships with Miami-Dade County Public Schools, the Herb Alpert School of Music at UCLA, and the University of Miami's Frost School of Music.

Discography 
 2005 - Beginnings
 2007 - Amazing Grace: A Gospel and Bluegrass Journey
 2008 - Shalom Pax
 2008 - Messiah Live
 2009 - IKON
 2010 - The Brandenburg Project
 2010 - Monteverdi: Vespers of the Blessed Virgin 1610
 2011 - A Seraphic Fire Christmas
 2011 - Brahms: Ein Deutsches Requiem, op. 45
 2012 - Silent Night
 2013 - Seraphic Fire
 2013 - Ave Maria: Gregorian Chant
 2014 - Reincarnations: A Century of American Choral Music
 2014 - Candlelight Carols: Music for Chorus and Harp
 2016 - Steal Away: The African American Concert Spiritual
 2021 - Hildegard von Bingen: Ordo virtutum

External links
 

American choirs
American vocal groups
Early music choirs
Culture of Miami